John Percy Jones (22 October 1872 – 12 October 1955) was an Australian politician.

He was born in Hobart to coachman Thomas John Jones and Bridget Costello. From the age of eleven he worked on a sheep station at Mona Vale, travelling to Melbourne in 1888 as a butcher's boy. He worked as a cattle drover and brass polish salesman before starting a tailoring firm in 1893. On 22 December 1897 he married Mary Ann Worrall, with whom he had three children. From 1905 to 1907 he was founding president of the Victorian Socialist Party, and in 1910 he was elected to the Victorian Legislative Council as a Labor member for Melbourne East Province. In 1913 he was a minister without portfolio. He was an outspoken anti-conscriptionist during World War I, and he served as Minister for Public Works and Immigration and Minister for Health in 1924. He was government leader in the Legislative Council from 1927 to 1928 and from 1929 to 1935. He was Minister for Public Works and Immigration and Minister for a Mines from 1927 to 1928 and from 1929 to 1932, when he was expelled from the Labor Party for supporting the Premiers' Plan. He joined the United Australia Party and served again as Public Works and Immigration Minister from 1932 to 1935. Having transferred to South Western Province in 1934, he retired from politics in 1940. Jones died in Parkville in 1955.

References

1872 births
1955 deaths
Australian Labor Party members of the Parliament of Victoria
United Australia Party members of the Parliament of Victoria
Members of the Victorian Legislative Council